The Eros Cinema is an Art Deco style, now defunct, cinema theatre located in Cambata Building at Churchgate, Mumbai, India. It has a seating capacity of 1,204 people per show.

Architects Shorabji Bhedwar designed the Streamline Moderne building, it marked the beginning of Back Bay reclamation in early 1938.

History
The foundation of Eros Cinema was laid in 1935. The cinema opened in 1938 and construction of this building on the then newly reclaimed Backbay plot housing shops and other businesses, apart from the cinema, took about two and a half years to complete.

Design
Partially faced with red Agra sandstone, this building is painted cream. The two wings of this Art Deco building meet up in a central block. The foyer is in white and black marble with touches of gold. Marble staircases with chromium handrails lead up to the upper floor. The murals are in muted colours depicting Indian architectures.

Importance
The building is part of The Victorian and Art Deco Ensemble of Mumbai, which was added to the list of World Heritage Sites in 2018.

Current Status
The Eros Cinema has been defunct since 2016. The Cambata Building which houses the theatre was sealed by the City Collector due to legal disputes but was later unsealed on the order of Bombay High Court, but the screening at the theatre has not been resumed.

However, the Cambata Family who owns the building has been in talks with other cinema businesses to revive the Eros Cinema with some renovation and changes to the building without harming the heritage structure.

References

Streamline Moderne architecture
Cinemas in Mumbai
Former cinemas
The Victorian and Art Deco Ensemble of Mumbai
Theatres completed in 1938
1938 establishments in India
20th-century architecture in India